Adhikarigama is a village in Kandy District, Central Province, Sri Lanka.

See also 
 List of towns in Central Province, Sri Lanka

External links 

Populated places in Kandy District